Carlton railway station is located on the Illawarra line, serving the Sydney suburb of Carlton. It is served by Sydney Trains T4 line services.

History
Carlton station opened in 1889 with two platforms. As part of the quadruplication of the Illawarra line, a second island platform was added in 1925. In January 2008, lifts were installed at the station.

It is the closest station to Jubilee Oval with NSW TrainLink services from Wollongong making extra stops during St George Illawarra Dragons games.

Platforms & services

Transport links
Carlton railway station is served by two NightRide routes:
N10: Sutherland station to Town Hall station
N11: Cronulla station to Town Hall station

References

External links

Carlton station details Transport for New South Wales

Easy Access railway stations in Sydney
Railway stations in Sydney
Railway stations in Australia opened in 1889
Illawarra railway line
Georges River Council
Bayside Council